USS Randolph may refer to:

, a sailing frigate launched in 1776 and exploded in 1778 during an engagement with HMS Yarmouth
, an aircraft carrier that served from 1944 to 1969

See also
MG Wallace F. Randolph, operated by the United States Army as a cable ship from 1942 to 1949

United States Navy ship names